The Manengon River is a river in the United States territory of Guam. The Manengon River is the longest river in Guam.

See also
List of rivers of Guam

References

Rivers of Guam